The Wales national under-19 football team is the national under-19 football team of Wales and is run by the Football Association of Wales. The team competes in the UEFA European Under-19 Championship held every year.

In 2019 the side qualified for the Elite Round of the European Under-19 Football Championship for the first time. In 2020 they qualified once again, after topping their qualifying group for the first time.

Recent history
The under-19 squad is a proving ground for talented youngsters. Full international players like Gareth Bale, Joe Allen,  and Wayne Hennessey, as well as most of the current Wales U21 side, have progressed through the team.

Players

Latest squad
Players born on or after 1 January 2004 are eligible for the 2023 UEFA European Under-19 Championship. Players in bold have attained full international caps. Clubs as of the date of the announcement.

Under-19 squad called up for two friendly matches against Scotland on 23 and 26 March 2023.

INJ = Withdrew from the squad due to injury

Results and fixtures

2020 UEFA European Under-19 Championship qualification

Group 5

2019 UEFA European Under-19 Championship qualification

Group 4

2018 UEFA European Under-19 Championship qualification

Group 13

2017 UEFA European Under-19 Championship qualification round

Group 6

See also
 UEFA European Under-19 Football Championship
 Football Association of Wales
 Wales national football team
 Wales national under-21 football team
 Wales national under-20 football team
 Wales national under-18 football team
 Wales national under-17 football team

References

External links
Football association of Wales home page

European national under-19 association football teams
F
Youth football in Wales